The Walton County School District is a public school district in Walton County, Georgia, United States, based in Monroe. It serves the communities of Between, Bold Springs, Campton, Good Hope, Loganville, Monroe, and Walnut Grove.

Schools
The Walton County School District has nine elementary schools, three middle schools, and three high schools.

Elementary schools
Atha Road Elementary School
Bay Creek Elementary School
Harmony Elementary School
Loganville Elementary School
Monroe Elementary School
Sharon Elementary School
Walker Park Elementary School
Walnut Grove Elementary School
Youth Elementary School

Middle schools
Carver Middle School
Loganville Middle School
Youth Middle School

High schools
Loganville High School
Monroe Area High School
Walnut Grove High School

References

External links

School districts in Georgia (U.S. state)
Education in Walton County, Georgia